Irvine Finlay Corbett (February 12, 1915 – October 7, 1986) was a Canadian former politician. He served in the Legislative Assembly of British Columbia from 1952 to 1963, as a Social Credit member for the constituency of Yale. He died in 1986 after a plane crash.

References

1915 births
1986 deaths
British Columbia Social Credit Party MLAs
People from Cranbrook, British Columbia
Accidental deaths in British Columbia
Victims of aviation accidents or incidents in Canada
Victims of aviation accidents or incidents in 1986